The women's 400 metres hurdles event at the 2015 Summer Universiade was held on 8 and 10 July at the Gwangju Universiade Main Stadium.

Medalists

Results

Heats
Qualification: First 2 in each heat (Q) and next 2 fastest (q) qualified for the final.

Final

References

400
2015 in women's athletics
2015